Cullerton is a surname. Notable people with the surname include:

John Cullerton (born 1948), American politician
Mick Cullerton (born 1948), Scottish footballer
Tom Cullerton (born 1969), American politician
William J. Cullerton (1923–2013), American World War II flying ace, businessman, radio show host, and outdoorsman